The National Weather Service State College, Pennsylvania is a local office of the National Weather Service responsible for monitoring weather conditions in central Pennsylvania. Open since May 1993, the office serves 33 counties and has about 25 employees.

The Weather Forecast Office (WFO) is located in State College in Centre County.

Counties Served

The National Weather Service in State College Pennsylvania covers these counties in Pennsylvania:

Adams
Blair
Bedford
Cambria
Cameron
Centre
Clearfield
Clinton
Columbia
Cumberland
Dauphin
Elk
Franklin
Fulton
Huntingdon
Juniata
Lancaster
Lebanon
Lycoming
McKean
Mifflin
Montour
Northumberland
Perry
Potter
Schuylkill
Snyder
Somerset
Sullivan
Tioga
Union
Warren
York

First-order/climate sites

Harrisburg International Airport (Middletown/Harrisburg)
Williamsport Regional Airport

References

External links
 NWS State College's website

State College, Pennsylvania
State College, Pennsylvania